The Mount Mabu chameleon (Nadzikambia baylissi) is one of two species in the genus Nadzikambia (derived from the species' name in Chichewa). It is a small chameleon from Mount Mabu in Mozambique.

References

  (2010): A new species of chameleon (Sauria: Chamaeleonidae: Nadzikambia) from Mount Mabu, central Mozambique. Afr. J. Herpetol. 59(2): 157–172.
 http://www.chameleoninfo.com/Species_Profiles.html

Endemic fauna of Mozambique
Nadzikambia
Reptiles described in 2010
Taxa named by William Roy Branch
Taxa named by Krystal A. Tolley